The 2012–13 season was Dumbarton's first season back in the Scottish First Division, having been promoted from the Scottish Second Division at the end of the 2011–12 season. Dumbarton also competed in the Challenge Cup, League Cup and the Scottish Cup.

Summary

Season
Dumbarton finished seventh in the Scottish First Division. They reached the first round of the Challenge Cup, the second round of the League Cup and the fourth round of the Scottish Cup.

Management
They began the season under the management of Alan Adamson. But on 22 October 2012, Adamson was sacked by the club following what was deemed a number of unacceptable results. Jack Ross took over as interim manager following Adamson's departure, while the club looked for a replacement. On 22 November, Ian Murray was appointed as player-manager. Jack Ross was named as his assistant, and he remained in charge for their game that weekend against Dunfermline Athletic.

Results and fixtures

Pre season

Scottish First Division

Ramsdens Cup

Scottish Communities League Cup

Scottish Cup

Stirlingshire Cup

Player statistics

Captains

Squad 
Last updated 5 May 2013

|}

Disciplinary record
Includes all competitive matches.
Last updated 5 May 2013

Team statistics

League table

Division summary

Transfers

Players in

Players out

Factfile
 The League match against Dunfermline Athletic on 23 March marked Mark Gilhaney's 100th appearance for Dumbarton in all national competitions - the 133rd Dumbarton player to reach this milestone.

See also
List of Dumbarton F.C. seasons

References

External links
Josh Horne (Dumbarton Football Club Historical Archive)
Jamie Lyden (Dumbarton Football Club Historical Archive)
Gary McKell (Dumbarton Football Club Historical Archive)
Reece Pearson (Dumbarton Football Club Historical Archive)
Glen Thomson (Dumbarton Football Club Historical Archive)
Owen Ronald (Dumbarton Football Club Historical Archive)

Dumbarton F.C. seasons
Scottish football clubs 2012–13 season